Sings the Blues is an album by singer/pianist/songwriter Nina Simone. This was Simone's first album for RCA Records after previously recording for Colpix Records and Philips Records. The album was also reissued in 2006 with bonus tracks, and re-packaged in 1991 by RCA/Novus as a 17-track compilation under the title The Blues.

Song information 
 "My Man's Gone Now," from the opera Porgy & Bess by George Gershwin.
 "Backlash Blues," one of Simone's civil rights songs. The lyrics were written by her friend and poet Langston Hughes.
 "I Want a Little Sugar in My Bowl," based on a song by Simone's great example, Bessie Smith, but with somewhat different lyrics.
 "The House of the Rising Sun" was previously recorded live by Simone in 1962 on Nina at the Village Gate. After its cover by The Animals became a hit, she recorded it in studio. The fast-paced version on this album is very different from the slow, intimate version on Nina at the Village Gate.

Track listing

Personnel 
Tracks 1-12
 Nina Simone - vocals, piano
 Eric Gale - guitar
 Rudy Stevenson - guitar
 Ernie Hayes - organ
 Bob Bushnell - bass
 Bernard Purdie - drums, timpani
 Buddy Lucas - harmonica, tenor saxophone

Track 13
 Nina Simone - vocals, piano
 Eric Gale - guitar
 Everett Barksdale - guitar
 Weldon Irvine - organ
 Richard Tee - organ
 Jerry Jemmott - bass
 probably Bernard Purdie - drums
 Gordon Powell - vibes, percussion
 Montego Joe - percussion
 George Devens - percussion
 Joe Shepley, Jimmy Nottingham, Harold Johnson, Wilbur Bascomb - trumpets
 Jimmy Cleveland, Richard Harris - trombones
 Seldon Powell, George Coleman, Norris Turney, Haywood Henry - saxophones
 Ralph H. Fields, Eileen Gilbert, Jerome Graff, Milt Grayson, Hilda Harris, Noah Hopkins, Maeretha Stewart, Barbara Webb - vocals
 Arranged and conducted by Weldon Irvine

Charts

References

External links 
 
 
 

1967 albums
Nina Simone albums
RCA Victor albums
Albums conducted by Weldon Irvine
Albums arranged by Weldon Irvine
Albums produced by Danny Davis (country musician)